St. James is a town in Brunswick County, North Carolina, United States. The population was 3,165 at the 2010 census, up from 804 in 2000. It is part of the Myrtle Beach metropolitan area.

Geography
It is bordered to the south, west, and north by the town of Oak Island. North Carolina Highway 211 forms part of the northern border of the town, leading east  to Southport and west  to U.S. Route 17 at Supply.

Demographics

2020 census

As of the 2020 United States census, there were 6,529 people, 2,713 households, and 2,458 families residing in the town.

2010 census
As of the census of 2010, there were 3,165 people, 1,575 households, and 1,386 families residing in the town. The population density was 383 people per square mile (148.0/km2). There were 2,263 housing units at an average density of 272.7/sq mi (105.7/km2). The racial makeup of the town was 97.8% White, 1.0% African American, 0.1% American Indian, 0.6% Asian, 0.2% some other race, and 0.3% from two or more races. Hispanic or Latino of any race were 0.9% of the population.

There were 1,575 households, out of which 3.0% had children under the age of 18 living with them, 86.3% were headed by married couples living together, 1.3% had a female householder with no husband present, and 12.0% were non-families. 10.4% of all households were made up of individuals, and 6.0% were someone living alone who was 65 years of age or older. The average household size was 2.01 and the average family size was 2.12.

In the town, the population was spread out, with 2.5% under the age of 18, 0.9% from 18 to 24, 3.7% from 25 to 44, 43.4% from 45 to 64, and 49.8% who were 65 years of age or older. The median age was 65.0 years. For every 100 females, there were 96.7 males. For every 100 females age 18 and over, there were 96.7 males.

For the period 2008–2012, the estimated median annual income for a household in the town was $82,476, and the median income for a family was $83,750. Male full-time workers had a median income of $46,094 versus $50,833 for females. The per capita income for the town was $67,796. 1.2% of the population and 0.9% of families were below the poverty line.

References

External links
 Town of St. James official website
 St. James City Guide

Towns in Brunswick County, North Carolina
Towns in North Carolina
Cape Fear (region)